Operation Stadium (Serbo-Croatian: Akcija stadion) is a 1977 Croatian film directed by Dušan Vukotić.

Cast 
 Igor Galo - Kruno
 Franjo Majetić - Stric Luka
 Zvonimir Črnko - Lujo Verdar
 Božidar Alić - Ferko
 Zvonko Lepetić - Stožernik Rubac
 Darko Srića - Otto
 Nataša Hržić - Milena 
 Jadranka Stilin - Nada
 Božidar Košćak - Lima
 Boris Kralj - Professor Mraović
 Hermina Pipinić - Gospođa Mraović
 Zlatko Madunić - Povjerenik ustaškog redarstva
 Slobodan Dimitrijević - Sturmbannführer Ebner
 Dušan Janićijević - Instruktor Reiner

References

External links
 
 Croatian film archive: List of Croatian films from 1944 to 2006

1977 films
Croatian-language films
Films directed by Dušan Vukotić
World War II films based on actual events
Films set in Zagreb
Croatian war films
1970s war films
Yugoslav war films
War films set in Partisan Yugoslavia
Yugoslav World War II films
Croatian World War II films